The United Rail Passenger Alliance (URPA), according to its website, is "America’s foremost passenger rail policy institute". URPA publishes the news bulletin, "This Week at Amtrak."

History 
The Alliance was formed by Andrew C. Selden, Austin M. Coates, Byron Alfred Nordberg, and Dr. Adrian D. Herzog in 1976. Since 1984 it has been chartered in the State of Minnesota, and is headquartered in Jacksonville, Florida by its president, J. Bruce Richardson.

URPA is a non-membership organization, solely supported by internal funding, as independent group which aims to improve America's passenger rail system through smart business practices. "URPA associates come from every part of the political and social spectrum, with the criteria of an understanding of the business of passenger rail and the importance of passenger rail as a key element of our domestic transportation network."

Organization 
URPA maintains an associated board of directors around the nation, with an executive committee composed of vice-presidents.

References

External links 
 United Rail Passenger Alliance

Passenger rail transportation in the United States
Non-profit organizations based in Minnesota
Organizations established in 1984